Amartex is a Manufacturing, Dyeing, Textile manufacturing and Retail Outlet Company in northern India, which was founded in 1988 by the Grover family. Amartex has 24 retail outlets selling ready-made garments under the brand name Groviano Italy.

Awards

References

Clothing retailers of India
Textile companies of India
Clothing companies established in 1988
Retail companies established in 1988
Companies based in Haryana
Indian companies established in 1988